The Sultan Abdul Jalil Shah Bridge is one of two bridges that cross the Perak River in Kuala Kangsar, Perak in Malaysia. The other bridge is the Iskandariah Bridge.

The bridge connects the town of Kuala Kangsar with Sayong village, spanning 330 meters across the river. It was officially opened by the late Almarhum Sultan Azlan Shah of Perak in June 2002.

See also
 List of tourist attractions in Perak

This bridge has five (5) 60m spans and is an integral arch bridge without expansion joint and bearing.  It is thus a state of the art design for bridges build in tropical climatic condition where temperature variation is minimal. The bridge will have little long term maintenance where quality of the structure was ensured during construction.

Bridges completed in 2002
Bridges in Perak
Kuala Kangsar District
2002 establishments in Malaysia